I'll See You in My Dreams may refer to:

Music
I'll See You in My Dreams (Doris Day album), an album featuring songs from the soundtrack of the 1951 film
I'll See You in My Dreams (Pat Boone album), 1962
"I'll See You in My Dreams" (1924 song), a popular song
"I'll See You in My Dreams" (Giant song), a 1989 song
"I'll See You in My Dreams" (Bruce Springsteen song), a 2020 song

Films
I'll See You in My Dreams (1951 film), a musical film, starring Doris Day and Danny Thomas, directed by Michael Curtiz
I'll See You in My Dreams (2003 film), a horror short film, directed by Miguel Ángel Vivas
I'll See You in My Dreams (2015 film), a drama film starring Blythe Danner

See also
 "Goodnight, Irene", a song first recorded in 1933 by Lead Belly, whose chorus concludes with the line "I'll see you in my dreams"
 If I See You in My Dreams, manga and anime by Noriyuki "Hanako" Yamahana